Paul Sandner Moller (born December 11, 1936 in Fruitvale, British Columbia, Canada) is a Canadian engineer who has spent over fifty years developing the Moller Skycar personal vertical takeoff and landing (VTOL) vehicle. The engine technology developed for the Skycar has also been adapted as a UAV platform called  the "aerobot". The rotapower engine itself has been spun off to a separate Moller company, Freedom Motors.

Education
Moller holds several degrees and certifications:
 D.A.M. (Diploma Aircraft Maintenance), Provincial Institute of Technology and Art, 1957
 D.A.E. (Diploma Aeronautical Engineering), Provincial Institute of Technology and Art 1958
 Master of Engineering, McGill University, 1961
 Ph.D. in Aerodynamics, McGill University, 1963

Career

In 1972, Moller founded Supertrapp Industries to market his invention of an engine silencing system. Moller sold Supertrapp in 1988 in order to fund development of his Skycar and its rotapower engine. 

In 2003, the Securities and Exchange Commission sued Moller for civil fraud (Securities And Exchange Commission v. Moller International, Inc., and Paul S. Moller, Defendants) in connection with value of shares after the initial public offering of stock, and for making unsubstantiated claims about the performance of the Skycar. Moller settled this lawsuit without admitting guilt by agreeing to a permanent injunction against claiming projected worth of Moller International stock and paying US$50,000. The shareholders of Moller International - collectively known as SOMI ("Shareholders Of Moller International") banded together on a website (no longer active) to  tell the Moller-side of the SEC issue.

Moller was a professor of Mechanical and Aeronautical Engineering, from 1963 to 1975, at the University of California, Davis and lives in Davis. He was featured in Popular Sciences January 2005 issue and appeared on the radio show Coast To Coast AM.

In 2007, Moller announced that the M200G Volantor, a successor to the Moller Skycar, would hopefully be on the market in the United States by early 2008. His proposed Autovolantor model includes an all-electric version powered by Altairnano batteries.

Moller's credibility has been questioned in recent years because of the vaporware nature of his creations. In April 2009, the National Post characterized the Moller M400 Skycar as a 'failure', and described the Moller company as "no longer believable enough to gain investors".

On May 18, 2009, Moller filed for personal protection under the Chapter 11 reorganization provisions of the federal bankruptcy law, however Moller International (corporation) did not file for bankruptcy and continues to do business . 

By 2009, Moller International had accumulated a deficit of $43.1 million.

Moller is President of Aerobotics Incorporated, a wholly owned subsidiary of Moller International, which designed an aerial system for video inspection of bridges, for Caltrans.

Media appearances
 Father of the Flying Car (2022)
  2057 : "The Body" (2007)
 Future Fantastic (1996)
 Mythbusters (2005)

See also 

 Moller Skycar
 M200G Volantor
 Moller M200X
 Flying car

References

External links 
 Moller International website
 Supertrapp Industries
 Freedom Motors
 Paul Moller and his flying car from Downside.com
 Paul Moller: My dream of a flying car | TED Talk 2004

1936 births
Living people
Aviation inventors
People from Davis, California
McGill University Faculty of Engineering alumni
People from the Regional District of Kootenay Boundary
Canadian expatriates in the United States